Karen Diane Mack (born January 4, 1950) is an American television producer for CBS and co-author of three novels from Los Angeles, California.

Early life
Karen Mack grew up in Las Vegas, Nevada. Her father, Jerome D. Mack, was a banker and real estate investor. When she was nine years old, he named Karen Avenue in Las Vegas after her. Her mother, née Joyce Rosenberg, was a philanthropist. Her paternal grandfather was the co-founder of the Bank of Las Vegas. She was raised in a Jewish household, with her father serving as president of Temple Beth Sholom.

Mack graduated cum laude graduate from the University of California, Los Angeles (UCLA), where she received a Bachelor of Arts degree in political science. She then received a Juris Doctor from the UCLA School of Law.

Career
Mack started her career as an entertainment attorney for Lorimar Television and Republic Studios. Later, she started producing television programs and movies. She is the executive producer of A Home for the Holidays on CBS. In 2008, the program won the Television Academy Honors from the Academy of Television Arts and Sciences.

Mack is also the co-author of three novels with Jennifer Kaufman. The first novel, published in 2006, was Number 1 on the New York Times Bestseller List. It talks about a bored young woman in West Los Angeles, who spends her time reading fiction to escape reality. The second novel, published in 2007, is about a thirty-year-old widow from Topanga Canyon who never finished high school and lies on her resume to get a job. The third novel, published in 2014, is about Sigmund Freud's sister-in-law, Minna Bernays, who moves in with her sister and Freud after she loses her job; soon, she becomes Freud's mistress.

Mack has been a contributor to The Los Angeles Times Magazine.

Political activity
Mack hosted a fundraiser for Hillary Clinton's 2016 presidential campaign.

Personal life
Mack is married to Russell Goldsmith, the chairman and chief executive officer of City National Bank. They reside in Los Angeles, California. They have a son, Brian Goldsmith, who worked as a producer on the CBS Evening News and as an assistant to Katie Couric.

Bibliography
Literacy and Longing in LA (2006).
A Version of the Truth (2007).
''Freud's Mistress (2014).

References

External links

Living people
Businesspeople from Las Vegas
Writers from Los Angeles
University of California, Los Angeles alumni
UCLA School of Law alumni
American lawyers
Television producers from California
American women novelists
Jewish American novelists
21st-century American novelists
21st-century American women writers
Writers from Las Vegas
American women television producers
1950 births
People from Los Angeles County, California
Mack family (banking)
21st-century American Jews